Oliver Geis (born 20 June 1991) is a German shooter. He represented his country at the 2016 Summer Olympics.

References

External links

1991 births
Living people
German male sport shooters
Shooters at the 2016 Summer Olympics
Olympic shooters of Germany
ISSF pistol shooters
People from Limburg an der Lahn
Sportspeople from Giessen (region)
Shooters at the 2019 European Games
European Games medalists in shooting
European Games gold medalists for Germany
Shooters at the 2020 Summer Olympics
21st-century German people